The 2013 European Fencing Championships was held in Zagreb, Croatia from 16–21 June 2013. Venue for the competition was Arena Zagreb.

Schedule

Medal summary

Men's events

Women's events

Medal table

Results overview

Men

Foil individual

Épée individual

Sabre individual

Foil team

Épée team

Sabre team

Women

Foil individual

Épée individual

Sabre individual

Foil team

Épée team

Sabre team

References

External links
Official website

2013
European Fencing Championships
2013 European Fencing Championships
European Fencing Championships
Sports competitions in Zagreb
2010s in Zagreb
Fencing competitions in Croatia
June 2013 sports events in Europe